The 2010–11 season was Stenhousemuir's second consecutive season in the Scottish Second Division, having been promoted from the Scottish Third Division at the end of the 2008–09 season. Stenhousemuir also competed in the Challenge Cup, League Cup and the Scottish Cup.

Summary
Stenhousemuir finished Eighth in the Second Division. They reached the Quarter-final of the Challenge Cup, the first round of the League Cup and the fourth round of the Scottish Cup.

Management
Stenhousemuir began the 2010–11 season under the management of John Coughlin. On 11 December 2010, Coughlin resigned as manager following their defeat to East Fife. Coaches Graeme Robertson and Kevin McGoldrick took over as caretaker managers. On 30 December 2010, Davie Irons was appointed as manager.

Results and fixtures

Scottish Second Division

Scottish Challenge Cup

Scottish League Cup

Scottish Cup

Player statistics

Squad 

|}

League table

References

2010andndash;11
Stenhousemuir